John Fane, 10th Earl of Westmorland,  (1 June 175915 December 1841), styled Lord Burghersh between 1771 and 1774, was a British Tory politician of the late 18th and early 19th centuries, who served in most of the cabinets of the period, primarily as Lord Privy Seal.

Background
Westmorland was the son of John Fane, 9th Earl of Westmorland, and Augusta, daughter of Lord Montague Bertie. He succeeded in the earldom on the death of his father in 1774.

Political career
In 1789 Westmorland was appointed Joint Postmaster General by William Pitt the Younger and sworn of the Privy Council. Already the same year he was appointed Lord Lieutenant of Ireland by Pitt, a post he held until 1794. On 18 February 1793, he was appointed a deputy lieutenant of Northamptonshire. From 1795 to 1798 he was Master of the Horse under Pitt. The latter year Pitt made him Lord Privy Seal, a position he would hold under five prime Ministers (Pitt, Addington, Pitt again, Portland, Perceval and Liverpool) for the next 35 years, except between 1806 and 1807 when Lord Grenville was in office.

Westmorland raised a Northamptonshire volunteer cavalry regiment in 1797, and was appointed its colonel on 20 April 1797. He was later Lord Lieutenant of Northamptonshire between 1828 and 1841. He was made a Knight of the Garter in 1793.

Family

Lord Westmorland married Sarah Anne Child (28 August 1764 – 9 November 1793), the only daughter and heiress of wealthy banker, Robert Child, against her father's wishes, at Gretna Green on 20 May 1782. Child consequently cut his daughter and her sons and their descendants out of his will, and made his daughter's daughters his heirs to prevent the Fanes from benefitting from this elopement. Their eldest daughter, Lady Sarah Sophia Fane (1785–1867), having thus been made testamentary heiress of her maternal grandfather, married George Child-Villiers, 5th Earl of Jersey, her husband assuming the additional surname of Child. 

The Earl and Countess of Westmorland had one son and four daughters: 
John Fane, 11th Earl of Westmorland (3 February 1784 – 16 October 1859), who succeeded his father.
Lady Sarah Sophia Fane (4 March 1785 – 26 January 1867) who married in 1804 George Child Villiers, 5th Earl of Jersey and became heiress to the Child fortune.
Lady Augusta Fane (1786–1871), who married firstly in 1804 (divorced 1809) Lord Boringdon, later Earl of Morley (by whom she was the mother of Henry Villiers Parker), and in 1809 Arthur Paget (1771–1840), a younger brother of Henry Paget, 1st Marquess of Anglesey.
Lady Maria Fane (1787–1834) who in 1805 married Viscount Duncannon, later 4th Earl of Bessborough; their sixth son Spencer Ponsonby-Fane inherited Brympton d'Evercy from his half-aunt Lady Georgiana.
Lady Charlotte Fane (1793–1822), died unmarried.

The Countess of Westmorland died relatively young in 1793, aged only 29, from undisclosed causes. Lord Westmorland married secondly Jane, daughter of Richard Huck-Saunders, in 1800. After some years of marriage, they later separated and she lived at Brympton d'Evercy.  By his second wife, he had three sons and two daughters, of whom only the eldest child Lady Georgiana Fane outlived both parents and inherited the Brympton estate.

Lady (Cicely Jane) Georgina Fane (25 January 1801 – 1875), died unmarried, leaving Brympton d'Evercy to her nephew Spencer Ponsonby-Fane
Hon. Charles Saunders John Fane (1802–1810)
Hon. Col. Henry Sutton Fane (1804–1857), died unmarried.
Hon. Montagu Augustus Villiers Fane (1805–1857), died unmarried.
Lady Evelina Fane (1807–1808)

Lord Westmorland died in December 1841, aged 82, and was succeeded in the earldom by his only son from his first marriage, John. The Countess of Westmorland died in March 1857.

Arms

References

1759 births
1841 deaths
18th-century English nobility
19th-century English nobility
Knights of the Garter
Lord-Lieutenants of Northamptonshire
Lords Lieutenant of Ireland
Lords Privy Seal
Members of the Privy Council of Great Britain
John
United Kingdom Postmasters General
Deputy Lieutenants of Northamptonshire
Earls of Westmorland
Barons Burghersh